National Highway 510, commonly referred to as NH 510 is a national highway in  India. It is a spur road of National Highway 10. NH-510 traverses the state of Sikkim in India.

Route 
Singtam - Tarku - Ravangla - Legship - Gyalshing.

Junctions  

  Terminal near Singtam.

See also 

 List of National Highways in India
 List of National Highways in India by state

References

External links 

 NH 510 on OpenStreetMap

National highways in India
National Highways in Sikkim